Glingebach (upper course: Falbecke) is a river in Finnentrop, North Rhine-Westphalia, Germany. It is a tributary of the Lenne river.

See also
List of rivers of North Rhine-Westphalia

Rivers of North Rhine-Westphalia
Rivers of Germany